Marginella cleryi is a species of sea snail, a marine gastropod mollusk in the family Marginellidae, the margin snails.

Description
The length of the shell attains 9 mm.

Distribution
This marine species occurs off Senegal.

References

 Cossignani T. (2006). Marginellidae & Cystiscidae of the World. L'Informatore Piceno. 408pp

External links
 Petit de la Saussaye S. (1836). [Marginella cleryi. Magasin de Zoologie. 6: pl. 73.]

cleryi
Gastropods described in 1836